Physical comedy is a form of comedy focused on manipulation of the body for a humorous effect. It can include slapstick, clowning, mime, physical stunts, or making funny faces.

Physical comedy originated as part of the Commedia dell'arte. It is now sometimes incorporated into sitcoms; for example, in the sitcom Three's Company, actor John Ritter frequently performed pratfalls (landing on the buttocks). Cartoons, particularly film shorts, also commonly depict an exaggerated form of physical comedy (incorporating cartoon physics), such as in Tom and Jerry and Wile E. Coyote and the Road Runner.

Slapstick elements include the trip, the slip, the double take, the collide, the fall (or faint), and the roar.

Examples

Charlie Chaplin started his film career as a physical comedian; although he developed additional means of comic expression, Chaplin's mature works continued to contain elements of slapstick.

Other comedians to employ physical comedy as a medium for their characters include Don Knotts, Jerry Lewis, Danny Kaye Martin Short.Marilyn Monroe 
Mark Twins, Keystone Kops  Laurel and Hardy Abbott and Costello Marx Brothers ,The Three Stooges 
In sitcoms, the use of physical comedy was seen in, for example, Jim Belushi and Larry Joe Campbell's characters Jim and Andy on According to Jim.

See also
Slapstick
Comedy
Physical theatre
Funny Business (TV series)

References

Comedy genres
Slapstick comedy